Mahmood Hussain Afsar Maudoodi (1874–1948) was an Urdu poet and a physician of Yunani medicine. He was the son of Ahmad Hussain Fida, who was a pupil of Mirza Ghalib.

References

Urdu-language poets from India
Urdu-language writers
1874 births
1948 deaths
Unani practitioners